Londonderry is a suburb of Greater Western Sydney, in the state of New South Wales, Australia. It is 60 kilometres north-west of the Sydney central business district, in the local government area of the City of Penrith.

History

Its post office opened on 1 February 1935, run by Robert Ernest Nutt, who also ran the attached store, and later became mayor of Castlereagh.

Heritage listings 
Londonderry has a number of heritage-listed sites, including:
 947-953 Londonderry Road: Fossil and Petrology collections, New South Wales

Population
According to the 2016 census of population, there were 3,906 people in Londonderry.
 Aboriginal and Torres Strait Islander people made up 6.8% of the population. 
 78.2% of people were born in Australia. The next most common country of birth was Malta at 1%.	   
 82.9% of people spoke only English at home. Other languages spoken at home included Maltese at 3.8%. 
 The most common responses for religion were Catholic 38.2%, Anglican 21.0% and No Religion 17.3%.

Geography
Londonderry is located in the northernmost part of the City of Penrith with the Driftway forming the boundary with the Hawkesbury City Council area. The Northern Road divides Londonderry from Berkshire Park while Cranebrook and Agnes Banks are its boundaries on its southern and western sides. Londonderry is a rural area and much of it still crown land. Because of its closeness to Richmond and distance from Penrith, the suburb has always had stronger links with Richmond than with Penrith.

Commercial area
Londonderry village in the centre of the suburb is a vital community connection point for local residents in the area. Amenities include shops, cafes, service stations, a post office, a community hall and neighbourhood centre, Londonderry Public School and the Londonderry Rural Fire Brigade station.

Sports and Recreation
Londonderry Park in the town centre is the home of the Londonderry Greys Rugby League Football Club which participates in the Penrith Junior Rugby League competition and the Londonderry Netball Club. The Richmond Race Club on Londonderry Road, Londonderry is a major greyhound racing facility and a number of greyhound trainers and owners reside locally. The Londonderry Pony Club has its grounds also on Londonderry Road in Londonderry.

References

Suburbs of Sydney